Davide Micillo (born 17 April 1971) is an Italian former professional footballer who played as a  goalkeeper. Following his retirement, he worked as a manager.

Career
Micillo was born in Vercelli. Throughout his career, he played for a number of Italian clubs, including as a reserve goalkeeper for Serie A clubs Juventus (1989–91) (and Parma (1999–2001). He last played for A.S.D.C. Borgomanero, in Serie D

Although he was never capped for the Italy senior team, he represented Italy at under-17 level. Following his retirement in 2008, he worked as a manager, and subsequently as a goalkeeping coach.

Honours

Club
Parma
 Coppa Italia: 1998–99
 UEFA Cup: 1998–99
 Supercoppa Italiana: 1999.

References

External links
 Career summary by playerhistory.com

1971 births
Living people
People from Vercelli
Association football goalkeepers
Italian footballers
Italy youth international footballers
Serie A players
Serie B players
Serie C players
A.C. Ancona players
Ravenna F.C. players
Genoa C.F.C. players
A.C. Cesena players
Atalanta B.C. players
Reggina 1914 players
Parma Calcio 1913 players
Cosenza Calcio 1914 players
Brescia Calcio players
Ascoli Calcio 1898 F.C. players
U.S. Catanzaro 1929 players
Novara F.C. players
UEFA Cup winning players